Acoustics II is the first acoustic full-length album from Minus the Bear. It marks the second acoustic work by the band, following 2008's Acoustics EP, encompassing songs from all their previous albums. Acoustics II includes two new compositions and eight other re-imagined versions of band and fan favorites. It was released on September 4, 2013 through the band's own Tigre Blanco Records, following a successful PledgeMusic campaign.

Track listing

Personnel
 Jake Snider – Vocals, Guitar
 Dave Knudson – Guitar
 Erin Tate – Drums, Percussion
 Cory Murchy – Bass
 Alex Rose – Keyboards, Vocals

References

External links

2013 EPs
Minus the Bear albums